Siskind is a German-Jewish surname meaning "sweet child", thought to have originated during the early nineteenth century period when German officials assigned surnames to Jews. People having this surname include:

Aaron Siskind (1903–1991), a renowned American photographer
Amy Siskind (born 1965), an American activist and writer
Arthur Siskind (born 1938), a lawyer, businessperson, and executive director of the News Corporation
Edward Siskind (1886–1955), an American football and basketball coach
Jeffrey Mark Siskind, writer of the optimizing batch whole-program Scheme compiler used in the program, Stalin
Jeremy Siskind, a jazz pianist taught by Sophia Rosoff
Martin Siskind, former manager of artist Purvis Young, who successfully petitioned for Young to be declared mentally incompetent
Murray Jay Siskind, a fictional character in the novel, White Noise
Paul Siskind, composer of the opera The Sailor-Boy and the Falcon, with librettist Alan Steinberg
Sarah Siskind (born 1978), an American folk singer and songwriter
Scott Siskind (born 1984), American blogger and psychiatrist better known under the pseudonym Scott Alexander

See also
Susskind

References

Jewish surnames